Mohamed Chouikh (born 1943) is an Algerian film-maker and actor.

Mohamed Chouikh was born at Mostaganem, Algeria on 3 September 1943, where he was to become a stage actor with a troupe which later developed into the Algerian National Theatre. In 1965, he acted in one of Algeria's greatest film productions, L'Aube des damnés by René Vautier and Ahmed Rachedi. In 1966 he took the role of Lakhdar (the son) in  Mohamed Lakhdar Hamina's highly successful Le vent des Aurès.  In 1972 he directed L'Embouchure for Algerian TV, followed in 1974 by  Les Paumés (1974). In 1982 he made his first feature-length film, Rupture, and has pursued a writer-director career since then.

Filmography
 Rupture (al-Inquita - Breakdown) 1982
 La Citadelle (al-Qala - The Citadel) 1988
 Youcef: La légende du septième dormant (Youcef kesat dekra sabera - Youcef: The Legend of the Seventh Sleeper) 1993
 L'Arche du désert (The Desert Ark) 1997
 Douar de femmes (Douar al-nisaa - Hamlet of Women) 2005
 L'Andalou (Al Andalousee) 2014

References

Further reading
 Guy Austin, "Mohamed Chouikh: From Anticolonial Commemoration to a Cinema of Contestation" in: Josef Gugler (ed.), Ten Arab Filmmakers: Political Dissent and Social Critique, Indiana University Press, 2015, pp. 166–187

Algerian film directors
Living people
1943 births
People from Mostaganem
Algerian male stage actors
Algerian screenwriters
20th-century Algerian male actors
Algerian male film actors
21st-century Algerian people